Babel is the original soundtrack album, on the Concord label, of the 2006 Academy Award-nominated and Golden Globe Award-winning film Babel starring Brad Pitt, Cate Blanchett, Adriana Barraza, Gael García Bernal, Rinko Kikuchi and Kōji Yakusho. The original score and songs were composed and produced by Gustavo Santaolalla.

The album won the Academy Award for Best Original Score and the BAFTA Award for Best Film Music. It was also nominated for the Golden Globe Award for Best Original Score (lost to the score of The Painted Veil).

The closing scene of the film features Ryuichi Sakamoto's "Bibo no Aozora." Sakamoto has previously won the BAFTA, Golden Globe, Grammy, and Academy Award for his score for The Last Emperor.

Track listing

Disc one 
 "Tazarine" - Gustavo Santaolalla
 "Tu Me Acostumbraste" - Chavela Vargas
 "September/The Joker" (ATFC"s Aces High/Shinichi Osawa remix) - Earth, Wind and Fire / Fatboy Slim
 "Deportation/Iguazu" - Gustavo Santaolalla
 "World Citizen-I Won't Be Disappointed" - David Sylvian/Ryuichi Sakamoto
 "Cumbia Sobre El Rio" - Blanquito Man/Control Machete/Celso Piña
 "Hiding It" - Gustavo Santaolalla
 "Masterpiece" - Rip Slyme
 "Desert Bus Ride" - Gustavo Santaolalla
 "Bibo No Aozora/Endless Flight/Babel" - Ryuichi Sakamoto/Jaques Morelenbaum/Everton Nelson/Gustavo Santaolalla
 "Tribal" - Gustavo Santaolalla
 "Para Que Regreses" - El Chapo de Sinaloa
 "Babel" - Nortec Collective
 "Amelia Desert Morning" - Gustavo Santaolalla
 "Jugo A La Vida" - Las Tucanes De Tijuana
 "Breathing Soul" - Gustavo Santaolalla
 "The Blinding Sun" - Gustavo Santaolalla

Disc two 
 "Only Love Can Conquer Hate" - Ryuichi Sakamoto
 "El Panchangon" - Los Incomparables
 "Two Worlds, One Heart" - Gustavo Santaolalla
 "The Phone Call" - Gustavo Santaolalla
 "Gekkoh" - Susumu Yokota
 "The Catch" - Gustavo Santaolalla
 "Mujer Hermosa" - Los Incomparables
 "Into the Wild" - Gustavo Santaolalla
 "Look Inside" - Gustavo Santaolalla
 "The Master" - Gustavo Santaolalla
 "Oh My Juliet!" - Takashi Fujii
 "Prayer" - Gustavo Santaolalla
 "El Besito Cachichurris" - Daniel Luna
 "Walking in Tokyo" - Gustavo Santaolalla
 "The Visitors" - Hamza El Din
 "Morning Pray" - Gustavo Santaolalla
 "Mi Adoracion" - Agua Caliente
 "The Skin of the Earth" - Gustavo Santaolalla
 "Bibo No Aozora/04" - Ryuichi Sakamoto/Jaques Morelenbaum

References 

2006 soundtrack albums
Albums produced by Gustavo Santaolalla
Drama film soundtracks
Scores that won the Best Original Score Academy Award